East Millinocket is a town in Penobscot County, Maine, United States. The population was 1,572 at the 2020 census.

Geography

Demographics

2010 census
As of the census of 2010, there were 1,723 people, 768 households, and 492 families living in the town. The racial makeup of the town was 97.3% White, 0.2% African American, 0.8% Native American, 0.3% Asian, 0.1% Pacific Islander, 0.5% from other races, and 0.8% from two or more races. Hispanic or Latino of any race were 0.8% of the population.

There were 768 households, of which 23.7% had children under the age of 18 living with them, 49.1% were married couples living together, 10.5% had a female householder with no husband present, 4.4% had a male householder with no wife present, and 35.9% were non-families. 31.3% of all households were made up of individuals, and 16.9% had someone living alone who was 65 years of age or older. The average household size was 2.22 and the average family size was 2.73.

The median age in the town was 48.6 years. 20.5% of residents were under the age of 18; 5.4% were between the ages of 18 and 24; 18.6% were from 25 to 44; 32.6% were from 45 to 64; and 23% were 65 years of age or older. The gender makeup of the town was 49.2% male and 50.8% female.

2000 census
As of the census of 2000, there were 1,828 people, 780 households, and 555 families living in the town. The racial makeup of the town was 98.30% White, 0.38% Native American, 0.38% Asian, 0.05% from other races, and 0.88% from two or more races. Hispanic or Latino of any race were 0.27% of the population.

There were 780 households, out of which 29.2% had children under the age of 18 living with them, 58.6% were married couples living together, 9.4% had a female householder with no husband present, and 28.8% were non-families. 26.3% of all households were made up of individuals, and 13.8% had someone living alone who was 65 years of age or older.  The average household size was 2.34 and the average family size was 2.77.

In the town, the population was spread out, with 23.3% under the age of 18, 4.5% from 18 to 24, 25.6% from 25 to 44, 25.3% from 45 to 64, and 21.3% who were 65 years of age or older.  The median age was 43 years. For every 100 females, there were 92.4 males.  For every 100 females age 18 and over, there were 89.7 males.

The median income for a household in the town was $33,542, and the median income for a family was $42,857. Males had a median income of $46,645 versus $23,500 for females. The per capita income for the town was $19,343.  About 11.5% of families and 13.5% of the population were below the poverty line, including 22.2% of those under age 18 and 5.9% of those age 65 or over.

Education
East Millinocket Schools operates public schools serving the community. Opal Myrick Elementary School and Schenck High School occupy one campus in East Millinocket. In addition the community is served by Medway Middle School in Medway.

The Katahdin Region Higher Education Center in East Millinocket provides higher education. The Eastern Maine Community College and the University of Maine System jointly established this center in 1987.

References

External links
 Town of East Millinocket official website

Towns in Penobscot County, Maine
Millinocket, Maine
Towns in Maine